The 110 Squadron of the Israeli Air Force, also known as the Knights of The North Squadron, was an F-16C fighter squadron based at Ramat David Airbase. The squadron was deactivated in 2017.

See also
 No. 110 Squadron RAF

References

Israeli Air Force squadrons